Beaufort is a town in Victoria, Australia. It is located on the Western Highway midway between Ararat and Ballarat, in the Pyrenees Shire local government area. At the 2016 census, Beaufort had a population of 1,539. The town takes its name either from Rear-Admiral Francis Beaufort or a Welsh village in Monmouthshire.

The area was once occupied by the Wadawurrung Aborigines who called the area 'Peerick' or 'Yarram-yarram'.

History
Thomas Mitchell passed through the district on his expedition of 1836.  Early settlers in the area were the Kirkland Brothers and a Mr. Hamilton; the latter took up Trawalla Station in 1838. The station was taken over by Adolphus Goldsmith in 1841 and he developed the property into a rich grazing enterprise. Lake Goldsmith was named after him.

Gold was discovered in 1852, with another gold rush from 1854 at nearby Fiery Creek. The Fiery Creek diggings supported four townships, Beaufort, Yam Holes Creek, View Point and Southern Cross, during the 1850s. The population on the fields reportedly reached approximately 100,000 people at its height in the late 1850s and produced 450,000 ounces of gold over a two-year period, 1855–1856.

The town was surveyed in 1857 and town allotments were sold from 1858. By 1860, Beaufort had become a small but strong agricultural, pastoral and timber district.  Beaufort's Court House was built in 1864  and the Post Office renamed as Beaufort the same year.

Education
Beaufort has two state schools, Beaufort Primary School and Beaufort Secondary College. Adult education programs are run from the Beaufort Community House & Learning Centre.

Transport

The Western Highway runs through the town and is the main highway between Melbourne and Adelaide.

The town is serviced by railway at the Beaufort railway station on the Ararat railway line.

Sports and culture
The town has an Australian Rules football club competing in the Central Highlands Football League.

Beaufort is primarily known around the state for the five-day music and arts festival, the Rainbow Serpent Festival which has been held since 1998 during January on the outskirts of the town.

The poet Bernard O'Dowd was born in Beaufort in 1881 and spent his early years in the town.

Female singer Max Sharam grew up there.

Twin town
  Beaufort, North Carolina

References

External links

Official visitor Guide for Beaufort
Produced in Beaufort
Visit Victoria Tourist Information
Annual Rainbow Serpent Festival

Mining towns in Victoria (Australia)
Towns in Victoria (Australia)
Western District (Victoria)